Alfred Stevens may refer to:

Alfred Stevens (painter) (1823–1906), Belgian painter
Alfred Stevens (sculptor) (1818–1875), British sculptor

See also
Alfred George Stephens ('A. G. Stephens') (1865–1933), Australian writer
Alfred Stephen (1802–1894), Australian judge